Anthony Evans Amoah is the member of parliament for the constituency. He was elected on the ticket of the New Patriotic Party (NPP) won a majority of 1,511 votes to become the MP. He was also the incumbent MP during the 2008 parliamentary elections of Ghana.

See also
List of Ghana Parliament constituencies

Youth MP for Mpohor Wasa East constituency in United Nation Youth Association-Parliament is HON.EMMANUEL AMOAFUL.

References

Parliamentary constituencies in the Western Region (Ghana)